Kylie Nicole Sicangco Padilla (born 25 January 1993) is a Filipino actress, singer and model. She is the daughter of actor Robin Padilla and Liezl Sicangco.

Early life 
Padilla was born on Angeles, Pampanga, to Filipino actors Robin Padilla and Liezl Sicangco. She studied in Queensland, Australia during her elementary years. She is a Muay Thai practitioner. Although raised in the Jehovah's Witnesses faith, she has been practicing Islam since April 1998, almost a decade before joining showbiz, despite not being a devout Muslim.

Career 
Padilla is a GMA Network contract star. Her TV series include Joaquin Bordado, The Good Daughter and Adarna. She was awarded as the Best New Female Personality (tied with Patricia Gayod) in the 22nd PMPC Star Awards for Television last 2008 for her acting performance in Joaquin Bordado.

Her career became more prominent due to her role in Encantadia (2016) where she portrayed the eponymous, controversial, and most-coveted role up-to-date, Sang'gre Amihan.

Personal life 
Padilla got engaged to actor Aljur Abrenica by late January 2017, with whom she has a child born on 4 August 2017, a boy. The two had started dating in 2011 until they broke up in 2014. They dated again in September 2016. They got married on 11 December 2018.

In December 2019, Padilla gave birth to her second child  However, the couple separated in April 2021. Padilla was later linked to JM de Guzman, although she denied the romance allegations between them. She also denied de Guzman's involvement in her and Abrenica's breakup.

Filmography

Television series

Television shows

Films

Discography 
 Seasons (2014)

Commercials

Endorsements 
 Marikina Shoe Exchange (MSE)
 Watsons Philippines

Awards

References

External links 
 

Filipino martial artists
Filipino Muay Thai practitioners
1993 births
Filipino people of Australian descent
Filipino people of Chinese descent
Filipino people of Spanish descent
Filipino people of American-Jewish descent
Filipino expatriates in Australia
Living people
Kylie
Filipino television actresses
Filipino film actresses
Filipino child actresses
Former Jehovah's Witnesses
GMA Network personalities
Filipina gravure idols
Filipino television variety show hosts